is a Japanese professional Go player.

Promotion record

References

External links
 Nihon Ki-in profile 
 GoBase.org profile
 Sensei's Library profile

1948 births
Japanese Go players
Living people